James McIntyre Leach (1 January 1891–1961) was an English footballer who played in the Football League for Aston Villa and Queens Park Rangers. Whilst at Aston Villa, Leach played in the 1913 FA Cup Final where they won 1–0 against Sunderland.

References

1891 births
1961 deaths
English footballers
Association football midfielders
English Football League players
Spennymoor United F.C. players
Aston Villa F.C. players
Queens Park Rangers F.C. players
FA Cup Final players